Vuç-Kurtaj is a settlement in the former Shkrel municipality, Shkodër County, northern Albania. At the 2015 local government reform it became part of the municipality Malësi e Madhe.

References

Shkrel
Populated places in Malësi e Madhe
Villages in Shkodër County